The Unfrocked One is a 1954 French drama film directed by Léo Joannon. At the 4th Berlin International Film Festival it won the Bronze Berlin Bear award.

Cast
 Pierre Fresnay as Maurice Morand
 Pierre Trabaud as Gérard Lacassagne
 Nicole Stéphane as Catherine Grandpré
 Marcelle Géniat as Mme. Morand
 Jacques Fabbri as L'ordonnance
 Abel Jacquin as Le père supérieur
 Georges Lannes as Le colonel
 Renaud Mary as L'antiquaire
 Guy Decomble as Le père Mascle
 René Havard as Un officier
 Christian Lude as Le chanoine Jusseaume
 Léo Joannon as Le chanoine Jousseaume
 Olivier Darrieux as Edoard
 Sylvie Février as La soeur de Gérard
 René Blancard as M. Lacassagne

References

External links

1954 films
1950s French-language films
1954 drama films
Films directed by Léo Joannon
French black-and-white films
Films with screenplays by Roland Laudenbach
French drama films
1950s French films